The four Bonne Citoyenne-class corvettes were built to a design by Raymond-Antoine Hasan. All members of the class were flush-decked, but with a long topgallant forecastle. The corvettes were launched between 1794 and 1796, and the Royal Navy captured all four between 1796 and 1798.

After the Royal Navy captured Bonne Citoyenne, the Admiralty used her lines as the basis for the Hermes-class post ships.

Ships
: launched 1794, captured 1796; as HMS Bonne Citoyenne sold 1819.
: launched 1795, captured 1796 and renamed HMS Jamaica; sold 1814.
Vaillante, launched 1796, captured 1798 and renamed HMS Danae, returned to French control by mutineers in 1801 and renamed Vaillante; sold 1801.
Gaieté, launched in 1797, captured the same year and commissioned as HMS Gaiete (also Gayette); sold in 1808.

Citations

References
 
  
 

 
Corvette classes
Ships built in France
Captured ships